North Knox High School is a public school located between the towns of Bicknell and Freelandville, Indiana.

About
The North Knox School Corp. came into existence in school year 1963-64, with the consolidation of all the smaller northern Knox County high schools to one central location. Those small-town high schools were located at Bicknell, Freelandville, Bruceville, Oaktown, Edwardsport, Sandborn, Westphalia and Emison. At that time, grades 1-8 remained at the smaller locations, with the exception of Edwardsport students, who were transferred to Freelandville School.
 
The original (1963–64) location of the North Knox High School was in the old Edwardsport school building. This Edwardsport building served as North Knox High School until the current structure on Indiana State Road 159 was opened in school year 1974-75. At this time, the original high school building at Edwardsport became North Knox East for grades 1-8. New structures were also opened in Bicknell and near Bruceville housing North Knox Central and North Knox West, grades 1-6. The current school building was based on the "open study" concept that was popular during the school's planning stages of the late 1960s. The school is all one level.

The school corporation is made up of the following towns in Northern Knox County: Bruceville, Bicknell/Ragsdale, Oaktown/Emison/Busseron, Edwardsport, Freelandville, Sandborn/Westphalia.

The school currently has 624 students enrolled with 48 faculty members.

Athletics
The North Knox High School mascot name is "Warriors". The original school colors were black and white, with red being added a few years later.

Recently, in 2006-2007 the football field went under renovation adding a two-story press box and a new team barn with "North Knox" on the top of the building and a Warrior head emblem on the front. The high school received new lockers in 2008. In 2004, the pool was filled in to create an auxiliary gym after swimming was taken out of the curriculum. The auxiliary gym now houses many activities.

Notable athletic alumni
Dan Beery (University of Tennessee at Chattanooga) -  American competition rower, Olympic champion, world champion and world cup gold medalist.
Nevin Ashley (Indiana State) - Currently the bullpen catcher for the Toronto Blue Jays, former New York Mets Catcher and former catcher for the Milwaukee Brewers.
Tricia Cullop (Purdue University) - Women's basketball coach - University of Toledo

See also
 List of high schools in Indiana

References

External links
 Official website

 

High schools in Southwestern Indiana
Public high schools in Indiana
Blue Chip Conference
Former Southern Indiana Athletic Conference members
Schools in Knox County, Indiana
1963 establishments in Indiana
Educational institutions established in 1963